The Basaa languages are a clade of Bantu languages coded Zone A.40 in Guthrie's classification. According to Nurse & Philippson (2003), the languages remaining from the formation of the Mbam group form a valid node. They are:
Basaa–Kogo (Bakoko), Rombi–Bankon.
Hijuk was listed as unclassified A.50 in Guthrie, but according to Ethnologue it is quite similar to Basaa.

Footnotes

References